"Darkness" is a song by American rapper Eminem, from his eleventh studio album Music to Be Murdered By. Its music video is the first video released for the album. "Darkness" was released as a single simultaneously with the rest of the album on January 17, 2020, with no prior announcement.

Content
Eddie Fu, staff writer at Genius, wrote: "The track channels the perspective of Stephen Paddock—who killed 60 people in the 2017 Las Vegas shooting—to make a point about gun control." Spencer Kornhaber noted in The Atlantic: "The song and the video do not simply restage the massacre, though. Eminem is attempting a double entendre, in which most of the lyrics could equally refer to the rapper himself, sitting in a hotel room, nervous before a concert."

The song interpolates the 1965 song "The Sound of Silence" by Simon & Garfunkel, using a piano version of its recurring guitar motif and its opening line, "Hello, darkness, my old friend."

Music video
On January 17, 2020, a music video of the song was released on Eminem's YouTube channel. The video follows the same plot as the lyrics. The first two verses alternate between showing Eminem in a dark room wearing a hoodie and an unidentified person in a hotel room wearing the same hoodie, surrounded by alcohol and ammunition. At the beginning of the third verse, the person takes off the hood and reveals himself to be the Las Vegas shooter, before opening fire on the concert-goers from the hotel window. As police try to break into his room, the shooter, instead of opening fire at the front door, shoots himself in the head.

The video ends with overlapping news feeds regarding gun violence, and the closing message: "When will it end? When enough people care. Register to vote at vote.gov. Make your voice heard and help change the gun laws in America." 

As of November 2022, the music video has over 61 million views.

Charts

Certifications

References

2020 singles
2020 songs
Eminem songs
Songs written by Eminem
Songs about criminals
Songs inspired by deaths
Protest songs
2017 Las Vegas shooting
Songs written by Luis Resto (musician)
Songs written by Paul Simon
Songs written by Royce da 5'9"
Aftermath Entertainment singles
Interscope Records singles
Shady Records singles
Songs about violence

Song recordings produced by Eminem